The 440s decade ran from January 1, 440, to December 31, 449.

Significant people
Attila the Hun, King of the Huns

References